Teddywaddy is a locality in the Lower Avoca ward of the local government area of the Shire of Buloke, Victoria, Australia. A rural CFA station is located on 'Lot 1 Teddywaddy Road.'

Teddywaddy post office opened on 1 August 1881, and was closed on 31 July 1973.

References